Ahmadabad (also Romanized as Aḩmadābād; also known as Aḩmadābād-e Kam Sefīdū, and Aḩmadābād-e Poshtū’īyeh) is a village in Mosaferabad Rural District, Rudkhaneh District, Rudan County, Hormozgan Province, Iran. At the 2006 census, its population was 66, in 16 families.

References 

Populated places in Rudan County